The 2004–05 All-Ireland Intermediate Club Football Championship was the second staging of the All-Ireland Intermediate Club Football Championship since its establishment by the Gaelic Athletic Association for the 2003–04 season. The championship ran from 24 October 2004 to 28 March 2005.

The All-Ireland final was played on 28 March 2005 at O'Moore Park in Portlaoise, between Carbery Rangers and Pomeroy Plunketts. Carbery Rangers won the match by 1-14 to 1-08 to claim their first ever championship title.

Connacht Intermediate Club Football Championship

Connacht quarter-final

Connacht semi-finals

Connacht final

Leinster Intermediate Club Football Championship

Leinster first round

Leinster quarter-finals

Leinster semi-finals

Leinster final

Munster Intermediate Club Football Championship

Munster quarter-finals

Munster semi-finals

Munster final

Ulster Intermediate Club Football Championship

Ulster preliminary round

Ulster quarter-finals

Ulster semi-finals

Ulster final

All-Ireland Intermediate Club Football Championship

All-Ireland quarter-final

All-Ireland semi-finals

All-Ireland final

Championship statistics

Miscellaneous

 The father of Carbery Rangers' goalkeeper, Kevin Santry, died suddenly on the morning of the All-Ireland final.

References

2004 in Irish sport
2005 in Irish sport
All-Ireland Intermediate Club Football Championship
All-Ireland Intermediate Club Football Championship